Anne C. Zeller is a physical anthropologist who specializes in the study of primates. She received her M.A.(1971) and Ph.D (1978) from the University of Toronto.

During her graduate studies she worked on chromosome analysis, comparing chimpanzee and human chromosomes. Anne has undertaken primate field research in Morocco, Gibraltar, Texas, Borneo and Africa. These two types of research combine interests in the physical development of humans from their primate ancestors, and the behavioral patterns of primates which are similar to those found among humans. However, her approach to physical anthropology is very wide-ranging and she has presented papers on witchcraft, dietary influences on behaviour, the role of children in evolution, and child abuse in primates, as well as on her major focus of primate communication.

She is also interested in the use of film in research and teaching, has prepared video tapes for use in her classes and is analyzing film taken during her field research. Her current research concerns the interactions of adults and infants in the socializing process of Macaca fascicularis, the crab-eating macaque of Indonesia.

Anne began teaching full-time at the University of Waterloo in the Department of Anthropology in 1982, and spent several years as the Chair or Head of Anthropology after 1993. Anne also held a series of positions at the University of Alberta, the University of Victoria and the University of Toronto. She retired from teaching in 2009.

Filmography
Chimpanzees Today
Five Species
Hominid Evolution 1: The Early Stages
Hominid Evolution 2: The Genus Homo
Images From the Field: Baboons
Lemurs of Madagascar
New World Monkeys
Primate-Human Interaction
Primate Patterns II
Sifakas of Madagascar
What Do Primatologists Do?

Select publications

Journal articles

Book chapters

Related filmmakers
John Marshall
Robert Gardner
Tim Asch

See also
 List of University of Waterloo people

References

Biography at University of Waterloo (website)

External links
 (biographical information and links for Anne Zeller)

American anthropologists
Women primatologists
Primatologists
Visual anthropologists
University of Toronto alumni
Academic staff of the University of Toronto
Academic staff of the University of Waterloo
Academic staff of the University of Alberta
Academic staff of the University of Victoria
Anthropology educators
1947 births
Living people